Pręgowo Gdańskie is a non-operational PKP railway station in Pręgowo Gdańskie (Pomeranian Voivodeship), Poland.

Lines crossing the station

References 
Pręgowo Gdańskie article at Polish stations database, URL accessed at 17 March 2006

Railway stations in Pomeranian Voivodeship
Disused railway stations in Pomeranian Voivodeship
Gdańsk County
Railway stations in Poland opened in 1907